AzMeCo (formally known as the Azerbaijan Methanol Company) is a methanol production company located in Azerbaijan. The company is primarily focused on petrochemical projects, specifically the construction and operation of gas and methanol factories. AzMeCo also works on hydrocarbon projects in the Caspian Sea.

History

2007
AzMeCo company was founded in 2007.

2012
In November 2012, the International Bank of Azerbaijan, Asia House, and TheCityUK organized a conference known as the Caspian Corridor Conference. The IBA, Asia House, and TheCityUK created a business framework at the conference upon which the future sale and marketing of AzMeCo's methanol was based.

Additionally, in 2012 BP agreed to buy methanol from AzMeCo. According to petrochemical industry research service Petrochemicals ResearchViews and Azerbaijani newspaper Today.Az, AzMeCo agreed to sell its entire methanol production exclusively to BP.

2013
AzMeCo built the first methanol plant in the South Caucasus region and Central Asia, according to Azer News. AzMeCo estimates that the plant will produce 560,000 tonnes of methanol per year. The International Bank of Azerbaijan and European Bank for Reconstruction and Development (EBRD) financed the construction of the plant.

2015 
AzMeCo declared it would align with Sovereign Wealth Fund conglomerates to invest with low risk in productive overseas projects.

Future
In 2013, the Chairman of AzMeCo told reporters that the company would invest in petrochemical and oil refinery plants in Libya.

References

External links
AzMeCo International website
http://www.news.az/articles/society/97898

Economy of Azerbaijan